The 1988 Brussels summit was the 8th NATO summit bringing the leaders of member nations together at the same time.  The formal sessions and informal meetings in Brussels, Belgium took place on 2–3 March 1988.

Background
In this period, the organization faced unresolved questions concerned whether a new generation of leaders would be as committed to NATO as their predecessors had been. Generational change in the leadership of the Soviet Union brought Mikhail Gorbachev to the international stage; but NATO leaders were increasingly uneasy about how to respond to his personable qualities. British Prime Minister Margaret Thatcher counseled that it was probably a good idea to "do business" with him, but other NATO leaders were uncertain about what Gorbachev's openness might be hiding. These fears were minimized by the Soviet announcement that troops were going to be withdrawn from Afghanistan.  The unilateral withdraw of 500,000 troops and 10,000 tanks from Eastern Europe sent an unmistakable message of change.

Agenda
The general discussions focused on the need for a reaffirmation of the purpose and principles of the Alliance.  Other informal meetings explored what NATO's posture should be in its objectives for East-West relations.

Accomplishments
The summit's work was directed towards adoption of a blueprint for strengthening stability in the whole of Europe through conventional arms control negotiations.

See also
 EU summit
 G8 summit

Notes

References
 Thomas, Ian Q.R. (1997).  The Promise of Alliance: NATO and the Political Imagination. Lanham: Rowman & Littlefield. ;

External links
  NATO update, 1988

Events in Brussels
1988 Brussels summit
Diplomatic conferences in Belgium
20th-century diplomatic conferences
1988 in international relations
1988 conferences
1988 in Belgium
1980s in Brussels
Belgium and NATO
November 1988 events in Europe